Denial is a mystery novel written by Stuart M. Kaminsky, a Grandmaster of the Mystery Writers of America. It is a Lew Fonesca mystery and was released July 8, 2005.

Plot
This novel has two mysteries.

Lew, a process server and an occasional amateur detective, is summoned by an elderly resident in Seaside Assisted Living asking him to prove that a murder has occurred in the facility because no one will believe her. A mother, named Nancy Root, pays him to find the hit-and-run driver who killed her son.

Main characters
 Lewis Fonesca - amateur sleuth
 Ann Horowitz - psychologist and friend of Lew
 Nancy Root - mother of Kyle McClory
 Kyle McClory - victim of the hit-and-run driver, John Welles
 John Wellington Welles - hit-and -run driver who ran over Kyle
 Dorothy Cgnozic - old woman who says she saw someone murdered in the Seaside Assisted Living
 Vivian Pastor - the one who was murdered by her daughter-in-law, Alberta Pastor
 Alberta Pastor - murderer of Vivian Pastor
 Georgia Cubbins - mother of Alberta who will confess what her daughter did to Vivian
 Ames McKinney - older friend and guardian of Lewis who helped him in his expedition

2005 American novels
American crime novels
Forge Books books